Martha Ofelia Moore Camacho (born 14 April 1981) is an American-born Mexican retired international footballer who played as a defender. She was a member of the Mexico women's national football team.

Born in the United States, Moore qualified to represent Mexico internationally through her mother. She was part of the team at the 1999 FIFA Women's World Cup and the 2002 CONCACAF Women's Gold Cup.

References

1981 births
Living people
American sportspeople of Mexican descent
Sportspeople from Harris County, Texas
American women's soccer players
Citizens of Mexico through descent
Mexican women's footballers
Women's association football defenders
Texas A&M Aggies women's soccer players
Mexico women's international footballers
1999 FIFA Women's World Cup players
Mexican people of Irish descent
People from Spring, Texas